Kaiserdaam may refer to-

Kaiserdamm, a street in Berlin, Germany
Kaiserdamm (Berlin U-Bahn), a U-Bahn station
Császártöltés, a village in Hungary